Histioea peruana is a moth of the subfamily Arctiinae. It was described by Max Gaede in 1926. It is found in Peru.

References

 

Arctiinae
Moths described in 1926